GNR may refer to:

Military and paramilitary 
 Gunner (rank)
 National Republican Guard (Italy), active during World War II
 National Republican Guard (Portugal)

Music 
 GNR (band), a Portuguese rock band
 Guns N' Roses, an American hard rock band

Transport 
 Dr. Arturo Umberto Illia Airport, serving General Roca, Río Negro, Argentina
 Gambia International Airlines
 Great North Road (disambiguation)
 Great Northern Railway (disambiguation)
Great Northern Railway of Canada
Great Northern Railway (Great Britain)
Great Northern Railway (Ireland)
Great Northern Railway (Queensland) in Australia
Great Northern Railway (U.S.), now part of the BNSF Railway system
 Green Road railway station, in England

Other uses 
 Great North Radio, a radio station in North East England
 Graphene nanoribbon
 Great North Run, a half marathon in north-east England